Mei Dingzuo (1549-1615) was a Chinese writer and playwright. He was described by a contemporary drama reviewer as being "an outstanding and talented descendant of a distinguished family..."

Life
He was born in Xuancheng. Mei's family consisted of academics and owned a large library of their own. Mei was friends with Tang Xianzu, Wang Shizhen, and Wang Daokun. His teacher was Jiang Qifang. Mei collected books. He would meet with his friends to share books they recently acquired. He failed imperial examinations and became a full-time writer. Mei's hired his own workers to create woodblocks for his books. He also published his books himself.

Legacy
Works by Mei are held in the National Central Library.

Works
Chang ming lü ji (Story of the Longevity Threads)
Kunlun nu (Kunlun Slave)
Yu he ji (Story of the Jade Box)

References

1549 births
1615 deaths
16th-century Chinese dramatists and playwrights
17th-century Chinese dramatists and playwrights